Dolmen Malls are a chain of shopping malls in Karachi, Pakistan, owned and operated by Dolmen Group. Dolmen Group was established in 1984 as a real estate investor. The group is currently a leading real estate group in Pakistan engaged in the development, construction and management of shopping malls, office towers and residential apartment blocks across Karachi.

The group operates three malls located in Clifton, Tariq Road, and Hyderi. Dolmen at Tariq Road was opened in 2000, Dolmen Mall Hyderi was built in 2008, and Dolmen Mall Clifton was built in 2011. In 2018, the Malls hosted Independence Day celebrations from Friday, 10 August to Tuesday, 14 August.

Dolmen Malls houses international and local retail, fashion and food brands and indoor recreational facilities including Sindbad Amusement Park. The Malls have been used by filmmakers and media persons to promote their shows, films, and projects.

Gallery

See also 
 List of shopping malls in Pakistan

References 

Shopping malls in Pakistan
Retail buildings in Pakistan
Buildings and structures in Karachi